Saskatoon Broadway was a constituency of the Legislative Assembly of Saskatchewan. It was located in the Broadway Avenue area of city of Saskatoon.

History 
Pat Atkinson was the riding's only member.

References 

Former provincial electoral districts of Saskatchewan
Saskatoon